Funkstown may refer to a location in the United States:

 Funkstown, Maryland, a small town in Washington County
 Battle of Funkstown, an American Civil War battle on July 10, 1863
 Foggy Bottom, Washington, D.C., a section of the US capital known colloquially in the 19th century as "Funkstown"

See also
 Funkytown (disambiguation)